Herbert Charles Edwin Blake (16 March 1908 – April 1986) was an English professional footballer who played as a centre half in the Football League for Bristol Rovers.

References

1908 births
1986 deaths
English footballers
Association football wing halves
English Football League players
Footballers from Bristol
Bristol City F.C. players
Yeovil Town F.C. players
Bristol Rovers F.C. players
Bath City F.C. players
Trowbridge Town F.C. players